Ramo language can refer to:

Bokar language of China and India
Uni language of Papua New Guinea (spoken in Ramo village)

See also
Ramo (disambiguation)